Jack Rowan was the professional name of Frank Rowan (1887 – 1959), a middleweight boxer from Philadelphia, Pennsylvania, who fought during the early 20th century. He is known to have participated in 37 fights, winning 19 and losing 14.

After retiring from professional boxing, Rowan went on to manage several successful boxers. He was the cousin of  Philadelphia Jack O'Brien, light heavyweight boxing champion of the world.

References

Boxers from Philadelphia
Middleweight boxers
1887 births
1959 deaths
American male boxers